Love 'N' Dancing is a 2009 film about a couple who take part in a competition in the world of swing dancing. The film was directed by Robert Iscove, and stars Amy Smart, Tom Malloy, and Billy Zane. Jeff Bihlman and Scot Bihlman ('The Bihlman Brothers') contributed 7 original songs to the 'Love N' Dancing' soundtrack.

Plot
Jessica Donovan (Amy Smart) is engaged to workaholic Kent (played by Billy Zane) and they decide to take dancing classes for their wedding. However Kent is so busy with his work that he misses all of the lessons. Jessica, however, develops a liking for dancing, and ultimately, for the dance teacher Jake (played by Tom Malloy). Jake is deaf (he uses hearing aids) but is a two-time former US Open Swing Dancing Champion. His former partner Corrine is now a judge in the Open Tournaments. Jake and Corrine also have a history as they were engaged but Corrine cheated on him which ultimately led to their break up.

With every lesson, Jessica's interest in both dancing and Jake increases dramatically. At the same time, her fiancé's behaviour becomes unpleasant; partly because she is too busy to cook at home, and partly because he is jealous that she spends too much time dancing with Jake.

Jessica shows both skill and talent; Jake asks her to participate in the National Open Swing competition. This leads to more unpleasantness between her and Kent and eventually she breaks up with him. Jake and Jessica also realize they have great chemistry and finally express their feelings for another just before it is time to participate in the competition.

At the competition, Corrine is on the panel of judges for this dance. Jake and Jessica manage to dance well and avoid the post-performance bickering of many of the other couples. A series of "where are they now" titles then reveals the future trajectories of the major characters.

Cast
 Amy Smart as Jessica Donovan
 Tom Malloy as Jake Mitchell
 Billy Zane as Kent Krandel
 Caroline Rhea as Bonnie
 Nicola Royston as Corrine Kennedy
 Leila Arcieri as Danielle
 Rachel Dratch as Kalle
 Betty White as Irene

Response

Box office
The film didn't perform well at Box Office due to its widest release in very few theaters earning $47,812 in domestic theaters and $26,036 from foreign theaters. The film grossed $73,848 worldwide.

Critical reception
The film received mostly negative reviews from the critics. On review aggregator Rotten Tomatoes, the film holds an approval rating of 17% based on twelve reviews, with an average rating of 3.28/10. On Metacritic, the film has a weighted average score of 43 out of 100, based on four critics, indicating "mixed or average reviews".

References

External links
 
 

2009 films
2000s dance films
2009 romantic drama films
American romantic drama films
2000s English-language films
Films about deaf people
Films about infidelity
Films directed by Robert Iscove
2000s American films